Mark Solonin (born May 29, 1958, in Kuybyshev, Soviet Union) is a Russian author of numerous books on the Second World War. An aviation engineer by training, he has lived since 2016 in Estonia.

Early life
Mark Semionovich Solonin was born in Kuybyshev, Soviet Union, on May 29, 1958.

Career
Solonin is criticized for his books, claimed to be pseudohistorical by his detractors and for supporting works such as Icebreaker by Viktor Suvorov about the beginning of the second world war.

Bibliography

 
 
 
 
 
 
 
 Solonin, Mark (2021), Spring Victory: Stalin's Glossed Over Crime, (in English), Independently Published/Amazon, 
 Solonin, Mark (2021), Two Essays: Coming Up From Behind or How the Soviet Union Won the War and If World Domination is the Aim then Strike First!, (in English), Independently Published/Amazon, 
 Solonin, Mark (2023), The Siege of Leningrad: Facts and Questions, (in English), Independently Published/Amazon,

See also
 Soviet offensive plans controversy

References

External links
 Web page of Mark Solonin
 YouTube channel of Mark Solonin

1958 births
Living people
Writers from Samara, Russia
Russian Jews
21st-century Russian historians
Russian aerospace engineers
Historians of World War II